Mt. Carmel Convent School, Rourkela  is a school for girls from the Pre-Primary level to the Higher Secondary level in Rourkela, India. It is located in 
Hamirpur, behind the Ispat General Hospital.
The school is administered by the Apostolic Carmel Education Society of Odisha in the Roman Catholic Church.

History
Mt. Carmel School is one of the prior, Second English medium school in the city of Rourkela, which was opened by sisters of Apostolic Carmel on 2 July 1959 with 80 students. In 1964, the school got its affiliation from Indian Certificate of Secondary Education (ICSE).

Courses offered
The school offers kindergarten, primary, middle & secondary education. With Classes I to XII having Science, Commerce & Arts stream at the senior secondary level. The School prepares the students for board level examinations of ICSE & ISC.

References

External links

Carmelite educational institutions
Catholic secondary schools in India
Primary schools in India
High schools and secondary schools in Odisha
Girls' schools in Odisha
Christian schools in Odisha
Schools in Rourkela
Educational institutions established in 1957
1957 establishments in Orissa